Handsworth Football Club is a football club based in Handsworth, Sheffield, South Yorkshire, England.

History
The club was established in 2014 as the result of a merger between Handsworth and Worksop Parramore; work on the merger had begun in 2013 and was finalised the following year. The new club took Worksop Parramore's place in the Premier Division of the Northern Counties East League. In their first season the club won the League Cup, beating Cleethorpes Town 4–3 in the final, coming back from 3–1 down with six minutes remaining.

In June 2019, the club was renamed Handsworth Football Club.

Season-by-season record

Grounds
Olivers Mount was the home ground of the original Handsworth, but it failed a ground grading test in 2012 which resulted in the club being relegated from the Northern Counties East League. Parramore Sports played at Sandy Lane in Worksop, which they bought after Worksop Town were evicted in 2008. After the merger in 2014, the club's first team played at Sandy Lane (which Worksop Town had returned to as tenants), while reserve and youth team games were played at Olivers Mount. The first team moved to Olivers Mount in 2020.

Honours
Northern Counties East League
League Cup winners 2014–15

Records
Best FA Cup performance: Third qualifying round, 2016–17, 2021–22
Best FA Vase performance: Third round, 2015–16
Record attendance: 1,561 vs Sheffield United, friendly match, 29 July 2016

See also
Handsworth F.C. players
Handsworth F.C. managers

References

External links
Official website

 
Football clubs in England
Sport in Sheffield
Association football clubs established in 2014
2014 establishments in England
Sheffield & Hallamshire County FA members
Northern Counties East Football League